Diary of an Unborn Child is the title of an anonymously-written anti-abortion article which was first read on the floor of the New York Senate in 1970. The article reappeared in 1980, and was turned into a song in 2005.

Timeline of the article
The original Diary of an Unborn Child was read on the floor of the New York State Senate by Republican Senate Majority Leader Earl W. Brydges on 11 April 1970. The New York Senate eventually struck down the state abortion law (31-26) in spite of Senator Brydges efforts.

The next appearance of this article was in 1980 when the article was published by the Watch Tower Bible and Tract Society in the 22 May 1980 issue of its Awake! magazine. Written in the first person, it is formatted to read as the "diary" of a fetus, chronicling the process of fetal development from an in-utero perspective, beginning with conception on 2 October and ending in an induced abortion on 28 December. The piece is intended to make readers reconsider their position on the morality of abortion.

The article was adapted into the song Diary of an Unborn Child by Mark Fox released on his album Lil' Markie Volume 1. The chorus (words and music) at the end are written by Rick and Rosemary Wilhelm. The song is sung from the point of view of a male fetus in utero, from its conception to its abortion. In between, the fetus's character chronicles its development.  The fetus's character expresses, among other things:
 excitement to see the real world
 a desire to be named "Andy" (with comments that the parents, not knowing the gender, are probably using the name "Barbara")
 a desire to meet its mother

Reactions to this song have been divided. Some in the anti-abortion movement use the song, or minor variations of it, as justification for their policies. However, the song, and Fox's work in general, has arguably gained most of its recognition in the pro-choice blogosphere, where people often post it as an unintentionally amusing form of black humor or camp. The Diary of an Unborn Child has also been played as a recurring audio clip in comedy podcasts, such as Distorted View Daily.

In popular culture
Segments of the diary are read aloud in the 2021 film Roe v. Wade.

References

Further reading 
   (NB. Aiello (1942-) wrote the story from the perspective of a developing embryo. The embryo describes her development from the beginning of her life on 28 March until 10 June, and ends with the sentence, "Mother, why did you let them stop my life?  We could have been so very happy!".)

External links 
 MP3 of the original song
 Flash animation set to excerpts of the song

Abortion in fiction
Songs about abortion
Fictional diaries